Charles Streeter (15 August 1895 – 14 October 1955) was an Australian rules footballer who played with Melbourne in the Victorian Football League (VFL).

Streeter served with the 8th Australian Light Horse Regiment in the First World War and was wounded at Gallipoli in 1915.

A defender, Streeter was recruited to Melbourne from Maffra. He represented Victoria in two interstate fixtures against South Australia in 1921 and played in the back pocket for Melbourne in their 1926 premiership team. In 1931 he coached the Melbourne seconds to a premiership, then in 1932 became club secretary.

References

External links

 
 

1895 births
Australian rules footballers from Victoria (Australia)
Melbourne Football Club players
Maffra Football Club players
Melbourne Football Club administrators
Australian military personnel of World War I
1955 deaths
Melbourne Football Club Premiership players
One-time VFL/AFL Premiership players
Military personnel from Victoria (Australia)